North Zulch is an unincorporated community in Madison County, Texas, United States, at the intersection of Farm-to-Market Road 39 and State Highway 21, and is 6 miles from the Navasota River and 13 miles west of Madisonville in west-central Madison County.

North Zulch has a post office using the zip code 77872

Education
The North Zulch Independent School District has served the community for over 100 years and is home to the North Zulch High School Bulldogs. The school is a 2A public school.

External links
 North Zulch, Texas (and Zulch, Texas) from the Handbook of Texas Online
 

Unincorporated communities in Texas
Unincorporated communities in Madison County, Texas